José Antonio "Pepe" Conde (born 11 March 1970) is a former professional tennis player from Spain.

Biography
Conde, who was born in Barcelona, made most of his main draw appearances on the ATP World Tour as a doubles player. 

He and partner Jordi Arrese made the final of the doubles at the 1994 Romanian Open, which they lost to Wayne Arthurs and Simon Youl.

In 1995 he broke into the world's top 100 ranked doubles players and peaked at 89 in September. 

He made the third round of both the 1996 Wimbledon Championships and 1996 US Open, both with Àlex Corretja.

ATP Tour career finals

Doubles: 1 (0–1)

Challenger titles

Doubles: (2)

References

External links
 
 

1970 births
Living people
Spanish male tennis players
Tennis players from Barcelona
Tennis players from Catalonia